A Model G20, also known as a Model G20 Summit, is an educational simulation for high school and college students. Students role play as government ministers from one of the G20 countries or their guests and negotiate solutions to defined problems. During a G20 summit, students learn about diplomacy, international relations, the G20, and other issues related to a theme of the summit. Some individual schools have Model G20 clubs for students interested in these topics.

It is similar to a Model United Nations. At the end of summits, individual delegates and entire delegations are often given awards for their performance.

American University
At American University in Washington, D.C., Model G20s have been hosted by the School of International Service since 2017 for both undergraduate and graduate students. It was established by Cecilia Nahón, the former ambassador of Argentina to the United States and a participant in actual G20 summits.

Cağaloğlu Anadolu Lisesi

, Cağaloğlu Anadolu Lisesi in Istanbul, Turkey has held a Model G20 every year since 2016. The first year, 80 students attended. The third annual Model G20 in 2018 was held at Istanbul Aydın University with students from Turkey and other nations attending.

Knovva Academy
The Knovva Academy Model G20 Summit has been held in cities around the world since 2016, including in Beijing, Boston, and Cambridge. The summit in Boston is held at Harvard University. At the 2019 Beijing summit, high school students from more than 20 countries attended. Delegates at Knovva Academy Model G20 summits attend several days of academic workshops and keynote speeches preparing them for the summits. They also spend time traveling in the host country. 

In addition to hosting Model G20s, Knovva Academy also sends a group to the Y20 summit, the official youth portion of the G20 that takes place in advance of the meeting of heads of state. Attendance at Knovva Academy events is by invitation only, with students needing to submit academic records and complete an interview.

İstanbul Ticaret University Model G20 
For the first time in Turkey, the University-based Model G20 will be held at Istanbul Ticaret University on 28-29 November 2022 bringing together Associate Professor Uğur Yasin ASAL as the consultant, ideate and the General Director Istemi Han Sadik.

See also 

 Experiential learning
 Global civics
 Global Classrooms
 Mock trial
 Model Arab League
 Model Congress
 Moot court

References

International relations
G20
 
Educational programs
Youth model government